Silvaine Gustave Sandras (24 February 1872 – 21 June 1951) was a French gymnast who competed in the early 20th century. He participated in the 1900 Summer Olympics in Paris, France, and won the equivalent (see 1900 Summer Olympics) of a gold medal in the only gymnastic event to take place at the games, the combined exercises (see Gymnastics at the 1900 Summer Olympics).

References

Sources
 

1872 births
1951 deaths
People from Croix, Nord
French male artistic gymnasts
Olympic gymnasts of France
Olympic gold medalists for France
Olympic medalists in gymnastics
Medalists at the 1900 Summer Olympics
Gymnasts at the 1900 Summer Olympics
Sportspeople from Nord (French department)
20th-century French people